Shahidabad (also Romanized as Shahīdābād; also known as Gaveyk, Gāvīk, and Gavyal) is a village in Shahidabad Rural District, Central District, Avaj County, Qazvin Province, Iran. At the 2006 census, its population was 1,466, in 385 families.

References 

Populated places in Avaj County